The 2023 Formula Regional Middle East Championship was a multi-event, Formula Regional open-wheel single seater motor racing championship. The championship featured a mix of professional and amateur drivers, competing in Formula Regional cars. It was the inaugural season of the championship, using the venues and dates for what was originally planned to be the Formula Regional Asian Championship, with a view of relaunching that championship in Southeast Asia later in 2023.

The season was held in January and February of 2023. Andrea Kimi Antonelli won the drivers' championship in the penultimate race, and in doing so also became rookie cup winner. His team, Mumbai Falcons Racing Limited, won the teams' title.

Teams and drivers 
All drivers competed using identical Tatuus-built Formula Regional cars powered by a 270HP turbocharged Alfa Romeo engine. The participating teams were announced on 15 November 2022.

 BlackArts Racing Team and BSR were among the teams announced to participate, but both withdrew their entry.
 Alex Dunne was scheduled to do a part-time campaign driving for Hitech Grand Prix, but did not enter any rounds.

Race calendar 
The 2023 calendar was first announced on 4 August 2022, back when the season still was to be the second season of the Formula Regional Asian Championship. With the creation of the new Middle Eastern championship, an updated calendar was also announced, replacing the first round in Abu Dhabi with another round at Kuwait Motor Town.

Results

Season report

First half 
The first ever Formula Regional Middle East Championship began in the middle of January at Dubai Autodrome with Gabriele Minì and Andrea Kimi Antonelli sharing poles in qualifying. Minì kept his lead at the start of race one as Antonelli in second was overtaken by Dino Beganovic. The top pair fought for the lead all throughout the race, unbothered by two safety car interventions. A timing glitch meant the "last lap" message was shown one lap too early, and Minì's team relayed that wrong information to him. He kept Beganovic behind as the pair crossed the line, but then slowed in anticipation of the race being over. This dropped him out of contention, promoting Matías Zagazeta to second. Third was Taylor Barnard, who had a remarkable race after starting in 27th. Race two was a much calmer affair, as Nikhil Bohra took a lights-to-flag victory starting from reverse-grid pole. Aiden Neate also finished where he started, in second, and Barnard was once again third, though this time he only had to climb five spots to do so. Antonelli was unable to hold on to his race three pole position, as Mari Boya went right past him on lap one. From then on, he built a gap to Antonelli and controlled the race. The race went ahead without interruptions, and Tasanapol Inthraphuvasak completed the podium. Antonelli's consistency allowed him to take the points lead by six points over Rafael Câmara.

Up next was the first FR-level race at Kuwait Motor Town, and new arrival Joshua Dürksen started it on pole. The first corner ended with multiple crashes, Brad Benavides getting flipped on his head and riding atop Boya's car, eight retirements with the poleman among them, and a red flag. Beganovic was able to profit off of the chaos, leading the restart in first place and continuing to lead Antonelli home. Behind the pair, Barnard got past Sebastián Montoya to complete the podium. Levente Révész started race two at the front, but was unable to keep his position and soon dropped back. What followed were multiple lead changes, with Rafael Villagómez, Bohra and eventually Joshua Dufek all in the lead for some time. Dufek was able to hold on in the end, but got disqualified for a technical infringement. This promoted Barnard to the win, ahead of Bohra and Câmara. The final race had Sami Meguetounif on pole, who held off a fast-starting Dürksen at the start. Two safety car periods later, Antonelli overtook Dürksen and set off after Meguetounif, but ran out of laps to catch him. While Antonelli still had not won a race, he grew his championship lead anyway, now twelve points ahead of double-winner Beganovic.

Just three days later, racing was back on in Kuwait, and qualifying was topped by the same two drivers. Race one began with the top three drivers, all Hyderabad Blackbirds, tripping over each other into the first braking zone. This meant Dürksen lost his second pole and also allowed Antonelli through into second place, before he eventually got past Boya for the lead. He kept him behind until the Spaniard got overtaken by Câmara, and took his first win in the category. Debutant Kirill Smal started race two at the front and had to content with Dufek and Barnard, before the latter then got into the lead and built a gap. This was not to last, however, as his car then started breaking down and he fell down the order. Smal was back in the lead, but Antonelli, who had started tenth and steadily climbed up the order, made short work of his lead, overtook him and claimed another win. Smal then received a penalty, allowing Villagómez and Lorenzo Fluxá to pick up podiums. At the start of race three, Antonelli again picked up the lead, but the move was made off track, so he sped off to build a gap in anticipation of a penalty. That used up too much of his tires too soon, however, and by the end of the race he fell back into the clutches of Barnard, who overtook him to claim the win. The penalty still came for Antonelli, dropping him back behind Câmara and Fluxá. However, his double win meant he now had a 44-point lead over his nearest challenger Barnard.

Second half 
The penultimate round of the season was held back in Dubai, where Antonelli and Nikita Bedrin shared poles. The former dropped down to third at the start of the first race, but was able to fight back past Barnard and Dufek into the lead through a safety car restart. His teammate Câmara followed him through, before another safety car ended the racing early. Pepe Martí was on reverse grid pole and held onto the lead as Fluxá got past Neate for second. Barnard and Antonelli, starting eighth and tenth, were soon climbing up the order. They ended up inside the top five, before Bedrin in fourth rear-ended Neate in third and both tumbled down the order. This promoted the championship protagonists to  third and fourth, before Antonelli was handed a penalty for an unsafe move that dropped him to tenth. Bedrin bounced back from this incident by defending his pole position at the start of race three, while behind him his two teammates Barnard and Dufek battled with Antonelli. Three safety car periods interrupted proceedings, with the third running until the end, guaranteeing Barnard's maiden win in a PHM Racing 1-2-3. Still, Antonelli's advantage grew, albeit only by a single point to 45, with 75 points still to play for.

The final round of the championship brought the series to the Yas Marina Circuit, but the polesitters were the same as in Dubai. The two title contenders started alongside each other and had a battle that ended in tears when Antonelli rear-ended Barnard, spun him around and earned himself a ten-second penalty. This promoted Boya into the virtual lead, ahead of Meguetounif and Câmara. A late safety car meant Antonelli's penalty had the maximum effect, and both him and Barnard remained pointless. Barnard needed to score points in race two to keep his title hopes alive, but had a horrible start that dropped him out of the top 20. While he worked to get back up the order, it was Michael Shin on pole that had to contend with Smal and Martí. Eventually, the latter took the lead from Shin and led the trio home. Barnard could only manage 18th place, so Antonelli took the championship despite receiving another penalty and not scoring again. Bedrin put a close to the season by winning the third race lights-to-flag, undeterred by a red-flag disruption. Behind him, multiple fights for the podium places ended in collisions, before Antonelli moved into the lead on the final lap, but had to give the place back as the move was made off track.

The championship was dominated by category rookies, who occupied the top three places in the final standings. Antonelli showed remarkable consistency, only finishing outside the top ten when the title was already all but secured. Being already handled as a generational talent after dominating the European F4 scene in 2022, his FRMEC campaign was the best possible preparation for the FRECA season. Barnard also quickly adapted to the car, often matching Antonelli, but his championship challenge was hampered by bad luck, like the disqualification in the first Dubai qualifying, or the mechanical failure in the penultimate Kuwait race. For the championship itself, the transition from the Asian to the Middle Eastern moniker went smoothly, and driver and team interest remained very high, with healthy, deep grids all throughout the season.

Championship standings

Scoring system 
Points were awarded to the top ten classified drivers.

Drivers' Championship

Rookie Cup

Teams' Championship 
Ahead of each event, the teams nominated two drivers that accumulated teams' points.

Notes

References

External links 

 

FRMEC
FRMEC
FRMEC
FRMEC
FRMEC